Užutrakis Manor is a late 19th-century residential manor of the Tyszkiewicz family in Užutrakis, on the shore of Lake Galvė, opposite the famous Trakai Castle.

It is considered one of the most important monuments of Lithuania’s estate heritage.

History 
From the 16th century, the peninsula jutting out between lakes Galvė and Skaistis, on which the Užutrakis Estate was built, as well as the surrounding lands, were under the care of the Tartars.

In the 18th century, Užutrakis Estate was the property of the Odincai family. It was sold from Odincai to Korevoms in 1846 and then, in the latter half of the 19th century, to Count Józef Tyszkiewicz sr. (1835-1891).

Józef Tyszkiewicz jr. (1868-1917) 
The estate was inherited by Count Józef Tyszkiewicz jr. (1868-1917) from his father.

Józef jr. and his wife Duchess Jadwiga Swiętopułk-Czetwertyńska (1878-1940) built the neoclassical manor house, designed by architect Józef Huss.

The interiors were decorated in the style of early French classicism.

The Užutrakis Estate was supported by a substantial farm, a large portion of which was located on the estate itself. Some distance from the mansion stood about 20 stone and wooden buildings: houses for the gardener, farm labourers, a  ferryman (the family crossed the Galvė and Skaistic isthmus by raft), a distillery, forge, stable etc. Half of the buildings have survived.

At the beginning of the First World War, Józef Tyszkiewicz jr. and his family fled to Russia and settled in Helsinki (Grand Duchy of Finland), where Józef died in 1917.

His wife Duchess Jadwiga Swiętopułk-Czetwertyńska and son Andrzej Tyszkiewicz (1899-1977) returned to Užutrakis after the war.

Andrzej Tyszkiewicz (1899-1977) 
When Józef died, Užutrakis was inherited by his son, Andrzej Tyszkiewicz.

Andrzej owned Užutrakis until the beginning of World War II.

After the Russians occupied the Vilnius region, Duchess Jadwiga Swiętopułk-Czetwertyńska fled to Kretinga Manor, the home of her husband's brother, Alexander. She died there in 1940 and was buried in the chapel of the Tyszkiewicz family in the Kretinga cemetery.

In 1939, Andrzej fled to London where he married Kamila Ibrahim-Achmetovič (1916-1973). Andrzej Tyszkiewicz died in 1973, leaving no children.

The Soviet Period 
When the Soviet Union occupied Lithuania in 1940, Užutrakis was nationalized.

After the war the manor became a sanatorium for soviet security officers. Later a Pioneer camp, a rest home and a national tourism company operated in the manor house.

During the Soviet period, the park was neglected, the original design of the mansion was destroyed, valuables were plundered and many of the buildings and park and flowerbed ornamentation were demolished. Copies of sculptures representing Roman gods made by the French artist Charles-Antoine Coysevox, as well as antique-style busts and vases, all vanished.

Trakai Historical National Park 
In 1995 Užutrakis Manor was entrusted to Trakai Historical National Park management. Its mansion, farm buildings, and park are undergoing restoration.

The manor sits on a peninsula, called Algirdo Island. From its terrace one can see the lake and Trakai Castle on one of the islands.

The Park 
The manor is surrounded by a mixed park designed by landscape architect Édouard André. The geometric-shaped flowerbeds, avenues of linden trees, ornamental gardens, marble vases and sculptures harmonize with scenic landscape elements that include hills, more than 20 ponds of varying sizes and shapes, and local and introduced greenery.

References

Manor houses in Lithuania